Named in the writings of Enoch. The Book of Parables 60:16, which is said to be an excerpt from the book of Noah, states Duidain to be a waste wilderness inhabited by the beast Behemoth. The location of this wilderness is described to the east of the Garden of Eden, where Enoch was raptured to the heavens.

References

Book of Enoch